ISS A/S (International Service System) is a facility management services company founded in Copenhagen, Denmark in 1901. ISS's core services include: security, cleaning, technical, food and workplace. The ISS Group’s revenue amounted to DKK 69.823 billion in 2020 and ISS has nearly 400,000 employees and activities in countries across Europe, Asia, North America, Latin America and the Pacific.

History 
1901 – ISS was founded in Copenhagen, Denmark as a small security company with 20 night watchmen named København-Frederiksberg Nattevagt (Copenhagen-Frederiksberg Night Watch). 
1934 – ISS entered the cleaning business with the establishment of Det Danske Rengørings Selskab (The Danish Cleaning Company) as an independent subsidiary of the security company. 
1946 – The first geographical expansion outside Denmark: Swedish subsidiary established. 
1968 – The company adopted the ISS name. 
1973 – Overseas expansion started. 
1975 – Group revenue reached DKK 1 billion. 
1971 – The firm expands to Austria and Spain. ISS also acquires part of Servi Systems Oy.
1977 – ISS shares listed on the Copenhagen Stock Exchange. 
1979 – The firm takes a major stake in the New York based Prudential Building Maintenance Corp.
1989 – The total number of employees under the Group reached 100,000. 
1995 – The U.S.-based arm of the company is merged and sold off after the discovery of about a decade of accounting irregularities.
1999 – ISS acquired Abilis, the second largest European provider of cleaning and specialised services, in a DKK 3.6 billion acquisition, the Group’s largest ever. Abilis had about 50,000 employees and annual revenues of DKK 5.2 billion in 1998. The total number of employees in the Group reached 200,000. 
2003 – ISS’ first major pan-European Integrated Facility Services contract signed. 
2005 – ISS A/S was acquired by funds advised by EQT Partners and Goldman Sachs Capital Partners, and delisted from the Copenhagen Stock Exchange. The total number of employees in the Group reached 300,000. 
2006 – Group revenue passed DKK 50 billion. ISS made the second-largest acquisition in company history, when acquiring the outstanding 51% of the shares in Tempo Services in Australia. 
2007 – Group revenue passed DKK 60 billion. ISS entered the US market through the acquisition of Sanitors Inc. The total number of employees in the Group reached 400,000. 
2008 – ISS’s largest ever international Integrated Facility Services contract was signed. 
2010 – Group revenue passed DKK 70 billion. The total number of employees in the Group reached 500,000. 
2011 – British security company G4S announces it will acquire ISS in a deal worth £5.2 billion.  The deal is later shelved, owing to shareholder unrest. 
2012 – Ontario Teachers' Pension Plan (Teachers') and Lego Group owners KIRKBI Invest A/S make EUR 500 million investment in ISS. 
2014 – ISS lists on the OMX Nasdaq Copenhagen Stock Exchange in Denmark’s largest IPO in two decades. 
2016 – ISS enters a commercial agreement with IBM to use IBM Watson's Internet of Things platform to transform the management of over 25,000 buildings around the world.
2017 – ISS signs the largest customer agreement in its history, with Deutsche Telekom, covering approximately 9,000 sites across Germany, more than 6,000 employees and about 4% of Group revenue.

Operations

General
In January 2016, ISS announced that it had acquired the UK, Ireland, and European activities of UK-based GS Hall, a technical services company focused on mechanical and electrical engineering, energy management, and compliance.

In November 2016, ISS announced that it had acquired Chile's fourth largest catering company, Apunto, with an annual revenue of DKK 116 million in 2015.

In April 2017, ISS announced that it had acquired US catering services company Guckenheimer with an annual revenue of approximately DKK 2,300 million and 3,200 employees in 33 US states.

Business model

Principal Subsidiaries
ISS Europe A/S;
ISS Finans A/S;
ISS Nordic A/S;
ISS Overseas A/S.

Principal Divisions
CarePartner;
Damage Control;
Facility Services;
Food Services;
ISS Aviation.

See also
 Facility management
 List of largest Danish companies

References

External links

International website
Danish website

Companies listed on Nasdaq Copenhagen
Service companies of Denmark
Service companies based in Copenhagen
Companies based in Gladsaxe Municipality
Danish brands
Cleaning companies
Security companies of Denmark
Danish companies established in 1901
Private providers of NHS services